Afrothreutes is a genus of moths belonging to the subfamily Olethreutinae of the family Tortricidae.

Species

 Afrothreutes larnacidia
Afrothreutes madoffei Aarvik, 2004
 Afrothreutes nigeriana

See also
List of Tortricidae genera

References

External links
tortricidae.com

Tortricidae genera
Olethreutini